Ali G, Aiii is a straight-to-video release of clips from Da Ali G Show (original, UK series) plus unaired segments from the show, hosted by Ali G himself.  The word "Aiii" refers to Ali G's slang/slur loosely pronounced "Ah-eye" and meaning "all right".

Contents
Welcome
Titles
Heaven
Dangerous 'Drugs'
FBI
Studio 54
Paul Daniels
Borat's Guide to Etiquette
Kids of Courage
Gail Porter
Cannes Porn Festival
Mohamed Al-Fayed
Borat's Guide to Hunting
Animal Rights
Space
"I Believe I Can Fly"
Borat's Guide to English Gentlemen
Discussion Medley
Increase Da Peace
Dangerous 'Weapons'
Guns
Religion
Borat's Guide to Henley
Goodbye
Jarvis Cocker
Ali's Final Thought
Out-takes and End Credits

Bonus features
Ali G's Christmas Message to the Nation
Easter Egg - A blond Brüno covers a punk music festival. Most likely from The Paramount Comedy Channel

External links

Television videos and DVDs
British comedy films
2000 comedy films
2000 films
2000s English-language films
2000s British films